Nansen is an old lunar impact crater along the northern limb of the Moon, on the eastern side of the north pole. This feature is viewed from the edge from the Earth, and it must be observed from orbit to see much detail. When brought into view during a favorable libration, this formation can be located by finding the crater Baillaud, then following the surface up towards the limb.

This formation has been heavily worn and eroded by minor impacts, leaving an irregular outer wall that is marked by multiple small craters and indentations. A small crater lies across the northern rim of Nansen, and a similar formation is located along the inner southern wall. A merged chain of tiny craters lies across the eastern rim.

The interior floor of Nansen is more hummocky and irregular in the northern half, while the southern part of the floor is relatively level. There is a small, bowl-shaped crater in the southeastern part of the floor, and many tiny craterlets lie across the interior and along the inner walls.

Satellite craters
By convention these features are identified on lunar maps by placing the letter on the side of the crater midpoint that is closest to Nansen.

References

 
 
 
 
 
 
 
 
 
 
 
 

Lunar crater
Impact craters on the Moon